Symphony No. 9 in E minor may refer to:

 Antonín Dvořák's Symphony No. 9, Op. 95, B. 178 (1893)
 Nikolai Myaskovsky's Symphony No. 9, Op. 28 (1926–7)
 Joachim Raff's Symphony No. 9, Op. 208 "Im Sommer" (1878)

See also
 List of symphonies in E minor
 List of symphonies in E-flat minor